Mitchell DeJong (born September 15, 1997) is an American professional race car driver and esports athlete competing in multiple disciplines, including Nitro Rallycross, and the eNASCAR iRacing series. He races for the 23XI Racing team.

Early life and career 
DeJong was born in Laguna Hills. He grew up in Southern California. He started riding ATVs in 2000. In 2002, he started racing go-karts. He started racing off-road trucks when he was eleven. In 2014, he got his debut at rallycross racing, by competing in the Global Rallycross Series. DeJong won the Gold metal in the X Games' Austin 2014 Rallycross Event, becoming the youngest to ever win the GOLD in a four-wheeled motorsports event.

Racing record

Rallycross racing

X Games

Red Bull's Global RallyCross Championship 
In 2017, he finished third in Red Bull's Global Rallycross Championship and received Rookie Of The Year honors.

iRacing esports racing 
In 2021, he ranked third in the eNASCAR Coca-Cola iRacing Series, behind the champion Keegan Leahy and runner-up Logan Clampitt.

In 2018, he finished second in the iRacing World Championship Grand Prix Series to Martin Kronke,
and won the iRacing Rallycross World Championship.

From 2017 to 2019, he finished the VRS GT iRacing World Championship ranking in the top three.

See also 
Bucky Lasek
Scott Speed
Tanner Foust

References 

American esports players
1997 births
Living people

American rally drivers
X Games athletes